Valentin Kozmich Ivanov (19 November 1934 – 8 November 2011) was a Russian footballer who played as a midfielder. He was the co-leading scorer at the 1962 World Cup, and the co-1960 European Nations' Cup top scorer.

Ivanov appeared 59 times for the Soviet Union, scoring 26 goals. He is the Soviet national football team's third-highest goalscorer of all time, behind only Oleg Blokhin and Oleg Protasov. One of the finest Russian players ever, Ivanov was noted for his pace, dribbling quality and technical ability.

Ivanov's four goals in the 1962 World Cup saw him named the tournament's top-scorer, along with five other players; he also scored two in the 1958 edition. He spent most of his club career with Torpedo Moscow, scoring 124 goals in 286 appearances in the Soviet Championship, the 9th all-time best record.

Personal life
Ivanov married Lidiya Ivanova, an Olympic champion in gymnastics in 1956 and 1960. Their son, also named Valentin (born 1961), is a retired international football referee.

Death
Ivanov died on 8 November 2011, shortly before his 77th birthday, following a long struggle with Alzheimer's disease.

Honours

Club
Torpedo Moscow
Soviet Top League: 1960, 1965
Soviet Cup: 1960

International
Soviet Union
UEFA European Football Championship: 1960, runner-up: 1964
Olympic Gold Medal: 1956

Individual
UEFA European Championship Golden Boot: 1960
UEFA European Championship Team of the Tournament: 1960, 1964
FIFA World Cup Top Scorer: 1962

Career statistics

Club

International

International goals
Scores and results table. Soviet Union's goal tally first:

References

1934 births
2011 deaths
Soviet football managers
Russian football managers
Russian expatriate football managers
Olympic footballers of the Soviet Union
Olympic gold medalists for the Soviet Union
Soviet footballers
Russian footballers
Soviet Top League players
FC Torpedo Moscow players
Footballers at the 1956 Summer Olympics
1958 FIFA World Cup players
1960 European Nations' Cup players
1962 FIFA World Cup players
1964 European Nations' Cup players
UEFA European Championship-winning players
Soviet Union international footballers
FC Torpedo Moscow managers
FC Asmaral Moscow managers
FC Moscow managers
Russian Premier League managers
Expatriate football managers in Morocco
Olympic medalists in football
Deaths from dementia in Russia
Deaths from Alzheimer's disease
Footballers from Moscow
Medalists at the 1956 Summer Olympics
Association football midfielders